Vettam Mani or Vettom Mani (27 August 1921 – 29 May 1987) was an eminent scholar and writer. His most famous work is the Purāņic Encyclopedia, which is a monumental and exhaustive study of Indian Puranas, epics and allied literature of Hinduism. It constituted the results of the author's devoted study and research extending over fourteen years.

Publications
 Purāņic Encyclopedia, Published by DC Books. The English Translation is published by Motilal Banarsidass, .
 English Gurunathan, Published by DC Books.
 Hindi Gurunathan , Published by DeAr Books. Contents Hindi Grammar , spoken Hindi, Hindi Malayalam Dictionary
 Selected Malayalam Poems of 2000 Years

Indian male writers
Scholars from Kerala
1987 deaths
1921 births
People from Kottayam district
Writers from Kerala
Indian encyclopedists